The Pakistan Medal was established by King George VI in 1949 as a commemorative medal. The medal commemorates service during the period just before and after the creation of the independent Dominion of Pakistan on 14 August 1947. Most recipients were members of the armed forces of Pakistan, including attached British personnel. 

The obverse has the Royal cypher of King George VI surrounded by the inscription GEORGIVS VI D:G:BR:OMN:REX. The reverse shows the flag of Pakistan surrounded by a wreath, with inscriptions in Urdu above and below. The  ribbon is dark green with a narrow central stripe of white, the colours on the flag of Pakistan. The name and details of the recipient were impressed on the edge of the medal.

See also

 Awards and decorations of the Pakistan Armed Forces
 Indian Independence Medal

References

Military awards and decorations of Pakistan
Military awards and decorations of the United Kingdom
Pakistan and the Commonwealth of Nations